Countless Centuries Fled into the Distance Like So Many Storms is a studio EP by Sonic Youth's Lee Ranaldo. It was released on July 22, 2008. It is a one-sided 12" EP, pressed on light-green vinyl, and housed in a clear PVC-jacket. It consists of five untitled instrumental tracks on the A-side, and an etched picture of a snake-like creature on the B-side. The etching is by Savage Pencil, and is similar to the one on Ranaldo's From Here to Infinity LP.

Track listing

"Untitled" - 4:05
"Untitled" - 3:28
"Untitled" - 1:15
"Untitled" - 2:07

References
sonicyouth.com, Info

Lee Ranaldo albums
2008 EPs